Michael Luck may refer to:

 Michael Laucke (born 1947), Canadian classical and flamenco guitarist
 Michael Luck (computer scientist), British computer scientist
 Micheal Luck (born 1982), Australian  professional rugby league player